Muhammed Uvais Moyikkal (born 31 July 1998) is an Indian professional footballer who plays as a defender for Indian Super League club Jamshedpur.

Club career

Gokulam Kerala 
On  7 June 2021, Uvais joined I-League club Gokulam Kerala on a two-year contract.

Jamshedpur 
Indian Super League (ISL) shield winner Jamshedpur FC have acquired the services of Muhammed Uvais ahead of the upcoming season, the club announced . The Defender has joined the Red Miners on a three-year deal, which will keep him at JFC until 2025.

Career statistics

Club

Honours 
'''Gokulam Kerala
 I-League: 2021–22

References

Living people
1998 births
People from Malappuram district
Indian footballers
Footballers from Kerala
Association football central defenders
I-League players
I-League 2nd Division players
Gokulam Kerala FC players